Aiedh Al-Sohaimi (Arabic:عايض السهيمي) is a football player, who plays for Al-Thoqbah as an attacking midfielder.

Honours

Clubs

References

Living people
Saudi Arabian footballers
1986 births
Al-Qadsiah FC players
Ettifaq FC players
Al-Nahda Club (Saudi Arabia) players
Al-Thoqbah Club players
Al-Taraji Club players
Place of birth missing (living people)
Saudi First Division League players
Saudi Professional League players
Saudi Second Division players
Saudi Third Division players
Association football midfielders